The Northern Bank £5 note was a banknote issued by Northern Bank for circulation in Northern Ireland, United Kingdom. It was the smallest denomination note issued by the bank. Following the takeover of Northern Bank by Danske Bank in 2004, production of the note ended and it was slowly removed from circulation.

History
In October 1999 a special polymer version featuring an illustration of the Space Shuttle was issued in celebration of the millennium. It was the first polymer banknote used in the United Kingdom. After the Northern Bank robbery in which £26.5 million was stolen, Northern Bank reprinted all of its banknotes with different designs apart from the £5 note which was not replaced.

Design

List of historical designs

References

External links 
 Danske Bank Banknotes
 The Association of Commercial Banknote Issuers

Banknotes of Northern Ireland
Five-base-unit banknotes